Montevecchi is an Italian surname. Notable people with the surname include:

Liliane Montevecchi (born 1932), French actress, dancer and singer
Michela Antonia Montevecchi (born 1971), Italian politician
Orsolina Montevecchi (1911–2009), Italian papyrologist
Silvano Montevecchi (1938–2013), Italian Roman Catholic bishop

Italian-language surnames